Andrew Fletcher may refer to:

Government
 Andrew Fletcher, Lord Innerpeffer (died 1650), Scottish judge
 Andrew Fletcher (patriot) (1655–1716), Scottish writer, politician and patriot
 Andrew Fletcher, British Member of Parliament for Haddington Burghs
 Andrew Fletcher, Lord Milton (1692–1766), Scottish judge and Lord Justice Clerk, nephew of the above

Sports
 Andy Fletcher (American football) (1895–1978), American football player
 Andrew Fletcher (cricketer) (born 1993), New Zealand cricketer
 Andy Fletcher (rugby league), rugby league footballer of the 1970s, 1980s and 1990s
 Andy Fletcher (umpire) (born 1966), American baseball umpire

Others
 Andrew Fletcher (businessman), Australian businessman
 Andy Fletcher (musician) (1961–2022), co-founder and member of the English electronic band Depeche Mode